Michael Shaw or Mike Shaw may refer to:
 Michael Shaw, Baron Shaw of Northstead (1920–2021), British politician
 Michael Shaw (American football) (born 1989), American football player
 Michael Shaw (Maine politician), American politician from Maine
 Mike Shaw (1957–2010), professional wrestler
 Mike Shaw (Family Affairs), fictional character
 Mike Shaw (heart operation patient), early open-heart surgery patient of C. Walton Lillehei
 Mike Shaw (footballer) (1901–1976), English footballer
 Sir Hugh Shaw Stewart, 8th Baronet (Michael Hugh Shaw-Stewart, 1854–1942), Scottish politician
 Michael James Shaw, American actor